Loryma sinuosalis is a species of snout moth in the genus Loryma. It was described by Patrice J.A. Leraut in 2007 and is known from South Africa (the type location is Johannesburg).

References

Moths described in 2007
Pyralini
Insects of Namibia
Moths of Africa